Barney's River Station   is a  community in the Canadian province of Nova Scotia, located in  Pictou County .

References
Barney's River Station on Destination Nova Scotia

Communities in Pictou County